Kevin Bernhardt is an American screenwriter, film actor, television actor, and producer. Bernhardt started as an actor in TV, with contract roles on Dynasty in 1989 and General Hospital (1985–1986). Following that, he had a dozen lead film roles until the mid-1990s - when he began seeing his screenplays produced - and decided to focus on writing. He had over 30 screenplays produced, before returning to a lead role opposite Amy Redford in Hate Crime, and most recently, a major supporting role in 2022's Medieval.

Early life and education
Bernhardt was born in Daytona Beach, Florida, where he was adopted by Navy Damage Control Officer 'Red' and wife Beverly. Years there were spent at an African-American elementary school (Turie T. Small), as part of the integration which continued in the late 1960s. 

Bernhardt attended college at Binghamton University on a National Merit Scholarship sponsored by the Eureka tent factory, where his mother worked.

Career
After completing bachelor's degrees in Economics and Drama in 1983 he traveled to Los Angeles in January 1984, where he passed the Series 7 exam and was hired by a securities company. But his true passion was the theater.

He landed a coveted contract role on General Hospital, and his storyline led the ratings for two years. Bernhardt took acting seriously enough to study in the small master class taught by Stella Adler, and he continued to work steadily as an actor for several years; in TV with another contract role as a priest on Dynasty, as well as several mostly 'bad-guy' leads in films such as Hellraiser III: Hell on Earth. But once he saw his first screenplay produced – he devoted his undivided attention to writing.

Since then his writing has attracted a diverse array of well-known actors, including Kevin Bacon, Ben Foster, Michael Caine, Michael Shannon, Chris Rock, Orlando Bloom, Christopher Plummer, Til Schweiger, Donald Sutherland, Matthew Goode, Roy Scheider, Djimon Hounsou, Patrick Swayze, Wesley Snipes, Charlie Sheen, Dolph Lundgren, John Lithgow, Tom Berenger, Peter Weller, Sylvester Stallone and Nick Nolte.

He has also worked with many notable directors including Shekhar Kapur (Elizabeth), Andrew Davis (Holes, The Fugitive), Abel Ferrara (King of NY), John Hillcoat  (Lawless), William Friedkin (The French Connection), Mimi Leder (Deep Impact), Renny Harlin (Die Hard 2, The Misfits), Sylvester Stallone (Rocky, Rambo), Frederic Forestier (Asterix...), Renny Harlin, Wayne Cramer (The Cooler), and Brad Anderson (The Call). His screenplays were largely used to create the first breakthrough films - for independent companies such as Elie Samaha's Franchise Pictures, and the predominant independent company in the world, Avi Lerner's Millennium-NuImage.

Writer – film 

 Medieval (2022) (screenplay consultant) Starring Michael Caine, Ben Foster, Matthew Goode, Til Schweiger, William Moseley
 Echo Boomers (2020) (screenplay) Starring Michael Shannon, Nick Robinson, Alex Pettyfer
 Rambo: Last Blood (2019) (uncredited screenplay) Starring Sylvester Stallone
 Kingdome Come: Deliverance (2018) (Story consultant) 
 Shiner (2018) (screenplay) 
 The Shanghai Job (2017) (screenplay) Starring Orlando Bloom 
 S.M.A.R.T. CHASE (2017) (screenplay) Starring Orlando Bloom and various Chinese stars. Produced by China's Wei Han
 Cliffs of Freedom (2018) (in post production) (screenplay) Produced by billionaire Metropoulos family. Starring Christopher Plummer, Patti Lupone (Tony Award winner)
 60'6" (2017) (in pre production) (screenplay) 
 Shi (2016) (in production) (screenplay) – Patrick Tatopoulos to direct/Constantin to finance.
 The Genesis Code (2016) (in pre production) (screenplay) – Brad Anderson to direct/Myriad to finance.
 The Dove (2017) (in production) (screenplay) – Producers Paul Schiff and Tai Duncan
 Pretty Boy Floyd (2016) (in pre production) (screenplay) – Andy Davis to direct.
 Daughter of Destiny (2011) (in pre production) (screenplay) – Shekhar Kapur to direct.
 Blue Eyed Samurai (2016) (in production) (producer/screenplay) Marcel Langenegger to direct.
 The Charm School (2016) (in production) (screenplay) Based on the Nelson DeMille novel. Producer Phil Anschultz & Kennedy/Marshall
 Coup D'Etat (2025) (in production) (screenplay) Co-written with Abel Ferrara
 Elephant White (2010) (in post production) (screenplay) Starring Djimon Hounsou and Kevin Bacon. Directed by Prachya Pinkaew
 The Godmother (2009) (pre-production) (writer)
 Veronica (2009) (pre-production) (written by) Amy Redford to direct.
 John Rambo (2008) (screenplay rewrite). Sylvester Stallone.
 Peaceful Warrior (2006) (screenplay). Directed by Victor Salva. Starring Nick Nolte.
 Virginia (2005) (written by)
 One Last Dance (2003) (uncredited) Starring Patrick Swayze.
 Without a Word (2001) (uncredited screenplay rewrite)
 The Art of War (2000) (uncredited screenplay rewrite). Starring Wesley Snipes, Michael Biehn.
 Jill Rips (Jill The Ripper) (1999) (written by) Starring Dolph Lundgren.
 Fear of Flying (1999) (screenplay). Starring Craig Sheffer, Jennifer Beals.
 Diplomatic Siege (1999) (screenplay). Starring Peter Weller, Daryl Hannah
 Five Aces (1999) (uncredited). Starring Charlie Sheen.
 Sweepers (1998) (story). Starring Dolph Lundgren.
 Top of the World (1997) (uncredited screenplay writer). Starring Dennis Hopper, Peter Weller, Tia Carrere, Joey Pantoliano
 Natural Enemy (1997) (TV) (screenplay). Starring Donald Sutherland, Leslie Ann Warren.
 The Peacekeeper (1997) (uncredited screenwriter). Starring Dolph Lundgren.
 Hollow Point (1996) (uncredited screenwriter). Starring John Lithgow, Donald Sutherland, Tia Carrere.
 The Immortals (1995)(screenplay). Starring Chris Rock, Eric Roberts, Joey Pantoliano, Tony Curtis.

Producer 
* Medieval (2018) (Executive producer)
 Best Sellers (2020) (Co-producer)
 Echo Boomers (2019) (Executive producer)
 Ghoul (2015) (Executive producer)
 Amazing Grace (2000) (producer)
 Top of the World (1997/1) (co-producer)
 The Immortals (1995) (co-producer)

Actor – film 
* Medieval (2020) - Captain Martin
 Hate Crime (2019) - Tom, costarring Amy Redford
 Shiner (2017) - Happy Baer 
 Top of the World (1997) -Dean, costarring Dennis Hopper, Peter Weller
 The Immortals (1995) -Billy Knox, costarring Chris Rock, Eric Roberts, Tony Curtis, Joey Pantoliano
 Treacherous (1993) -Damon Vasquez, costarring Adam Baldwin, Tia Carrere, C. Thomas Howell
 Beauty School (1993) -Colt
 Hellraiser III: Hell on Earth (1992) -J.P. Monroe / J.P. Cenobite, costarring Pinhead
 Midnight Warrior (1989) -Nick Branca
 Counterforce (1988) -Sutherland, costarring Robert Forster, George Kennedy, Louis Jourdan, Kabir Bedi
 Kick or Die (1987) -Don Potter
 Le feu sous la peau (1985) -Raphael

Actor – television 
 General Hospital (1984, 15 episodes) – Frisco Jones
 General Hospital (Series regular 1985–86, 310 episodes) – Kevin O'Connor
 Dynasty (1989)
 "Catch 22" (May 10, 1989) TV episode - Father Tanner McBride
 "Blasts from the Past" (May 3, 1989) TV episode - Father Tanner McBride
 "Here Comes the Son" (April 26, 1989)TV episode - Father Tanner McBride
 "No Bones About It" (April 12, 1989) TV episode - Father Tanner McBride
 "Tale of the Tape" (April 5, 1989) TV episode - Father Tanner McBride
 "Sins of the Father" (March 26, 1989) TV episode - Father Tanner McBride
 "Grimes and Punishment" (March 22, 1989) TV episode - Father Tanner McBride
 "The Son Also Rises" (March 15, 1989) TV episode - Father Tanner McBride
 "Virginia Reels" (February 22, 1989) TV episode - Father Tanner McBride
 "All Hands on Dex" (February 15, 1989) TV episode - Father Tanner McBride
 Superboy (2 episodes, 1989–1990) – Dr. Byron Shelley
 "Run Dracula, Run" (February 3, 1990) TV episode - Dr. Byron Shelley
 "Young Dracula" (October 28, 1989) TV episode - Dr. Byron Shelley

Miscellaneous crew 

 The Peacekeeper (1997) (technical advisor)
 Hollow Point (1996)(story consultant)

References

External links 
 

1961 births
Living people
American male film actors
American male television actors
Binghamton University alumni
American male screenwriters
People from Daytona Beach, Florida
Screenwriters from Florida
Film producers from Florida